The wooden churches of Maramureș in the Maramureș region of northern Transylvania are a group of almost one hundred Orthodox churches, and occasionally Greek-Catholic ones, of different architectural solutions from different periods and areas. The Maramureș churches are high timber constructions with characteristic tall, slim bell towers at the western end of the building. They are a particular vernacular expression of the cultural landscape of this mountainous area of northern Romania.

Maramureș is one of the better-known regions of Romania, with autonomous traditions since the Middle Ages. Its well-preserved wooden villages and churches, its traditional lifestyle, and the local colourful dresses still in use make Maramureș as near to a living museum as can be found in Europe.

The wooden churches of the region that still stand were built starting from the 17th century all the way to 19th century. Some were erected on the place of older churches. They were a response to the prohibition against the erection of stone Orthodox churches by the Catholic Austro-Hungarian authorities. The churches are made of thick logs, some are quite small and dark inside but several of them have impressive measures. They are painted with rather "naïve" Biblical scenes, mostly by local painters. The most characteristic features are the tall tower above the entrance and the massive roof that seems to dwarf the main body of the church.

Eight were listed by the UNESCO as World Heritage Sites in 1999, for their religious architecture and timber construction traditions. These are: Bârsana, Budești, Desești, Ieud, Plopiș, Poienile Izei, Rogoz, Șurdești.

Description

The historical Romanian region of Maramureș, partitioned between Romania and Sub-Carpathian Ruthenia after World War I, is one of the places where traditional log building was not interrupted and where a rich heritage in wood survives. The tradition of building wooden churches in central and southern Maramureș can be traced from the beginning of the 16th century to the turn of the 18th century. Since the knowledge used to build the local wooden churches circulated throughout Europe, their understanding is of high interest far outside the region.

In Maramureș today almost 100 wooden churches still stand, about one third of their total two centuries ago. Besides the extant wooden churches, a major source of knowledge is still saved by a number of practicing senior carpenters with relevant knowledge and skills in traditional carpentry.

From the Middle Ages until the turn of the 18th century the skills, knowledge and experience to build ample log structures with plane and well sealed walls, as well as with flush joints, were performances out of the ordinary. The craftsmen from Maramureș who were able to reach such levels were not simple peasants but well specialised church carpenters who inherited and maintained this advanced knowledge to exclusively build houses of worship.

Since the local tradition to erect wooden churches depended on those who built and used them, it is fundamental to identify the local builders and founders. The earlier blurred distinction between them veiled their separate roles in shaping the wooden churches and hindered us from a clear understanding of the results.

The extant wooden churches from Maramureș reveal the existence during the 17th and 18th centuries of at least two main family schools of church carpenters. There are further distinguishable three main itineraries and numerous smaller ones, indicating the work of some of the most important church carpenters ever active in the region and in some cases even shifts among generations. In general, the church carpenters stood for the technical performances, the high quality of the wood work and the artistic refinement.

In a long perspective, the true creators of the local wooden churches were actually the commissioning founders. Especially the role of the noble founders of Eastern Christian rite was decisive in the formation of a regional character among the local wooden churches. The wooden churches from Maramureș closely mirror the local society of modest country landlords, manifesting themselves along several centuries in their double condition of Eastern Christians and Western nobles.

The wooden churches from Maramureș open necessary connections with similar performances throughout Europe. Seemingly the local distinction made between sacred and profane rooms was characteristic for many other rural regions on the continent. The highest knowledge in log building seems to have had a sacred purpose with wide continental circulation and therefore in many places requires distinction from the more regionally rooted vernacular one.

The publication in a journal from 1866 of several drawings representing a wooden church from Seini, situated in the neighbouring Szatmár County, produced echoes in Europe, being compared with the already famous Norwegian stave churches.

With the resurgence of church construction after the Romanian Revolution of 1989, there are new churches built in the traditional style.

Wooden churches
The list shows extant wooden churches in bold and also includes some known vanished ones. For those now in Ukraine, Romanian and Hungarian names of Ukrainian villages are given in (parentheses). In Romanian, Susani denotes "high-dwellers" and Josani "lower-dwellers". Thus the names distinguish the churches of those large villages which had more than one.

Cosău valley 	

Budești Josani (UNESCO)

Călinești Susani 	

Sârbi Susani	

Iza valley
Mănăstirea Bârsana (UNESCO)
Botiza
Botiza old
Cuhea  
Dragomirești 
Glod
Ieud Deal (UNESCO)
Ieud Șes	
Nănești
Oncești
Poienile Izei (UNESCO)
Rozavlea 

Slătioara
Strâmtura
Valea Stejarului
Lăpuș valley
Rogoz (UNESCO)
Mara valley
Berbești
Breb
Desești (UNESCO)
Hărnicești
Hoteni
Mănăstirea
Sat Șugătag
Vișeu valley

Crăciunești
Moisei Josani

Poienile de sub Munte
Repedea
Rona de Jos
Văleni
 Ukrainian side
Apșița , 
Apșa de Mijloc, Susani , 
Apșa de Mijloc, Josani
Apșa din Jos, Părău , 
Danylovo , 
Dulovo , 
Ganychi , 
 , 
Kolodne 
 , 
 , 
Olexandrivka , 
Ruska Pole I , 
Ruska Pole II 
Sokyrnytsya , 
Steblivka , 
Ternovo ,

Gallery

See also
 List of World Heritage Sites in Romania
 Vernacular architecture of the Carpathians
 Carpathian wooden churches
 Wooden churches of the Slovak Carpathians
 Wooden churches of Southern Lesser Poland
 Wooden churches in Ukraine
 Wooden tserkvas of the Carpathian region in Poland and Ukraine

References

External links

Archived at Ghostarchive and the Wayback Machine: 

 
World Heritage Sites in Romania